Taiwan is part of the collision zone between the Yangtze Plate and Philippine Sea Plate. Eastern and southern Taiwan are the northern end of the Philippine Mobile Belt.

Located next to an oceanic trench and volcanic system in a tectonic collision zone, Taiwan has evolved a unique environment that produces high-temperature springs with crystal-clear water, usually both clean and safe to drink. These hot springs are commonly used for spas and resorts.

Soaking in hot springs became popular in Taiwan around 1895 during the 50-year long colonial rule by Japan.

History

The first mention of Taiwan's hot springs came from a 1697 manuscript, but they were not developed until 1893, when a German businessman discovered Beitou and later established a small local spa. 

Under Japanese rule, the government constantly promoted and further enhanced the natural hot springs. The Japanese rule brought with them their rich onsen culture of spring soaking, which had a great influence on Taiwan.

In March 1896,  from Osaka, Japan opened Taiwan's first hot spring hotel, called . He not only heralded a new era of hot spring bathing in Beitou, but also paved the road for a whole new hot spring culture for Taiwan. In the Japanese onsen culture, hot springs are claimed to offer many health benefits. As well as raising energy levels, the minerals in the water are commonly suggested to help treat chronic fatigue, eczema or arthritis.

During Japanese rule, the four major hot springs in Taiwan were in modern-day Beitou, Yangmingshan, Guanziling and Sichongxi. However, under Republic of China administration starting from 1945, the hot spring culture in Taiwan gradually lost momentum. It was not until 1999 that the authorities again started large-scale promotion of Taiwan's hot springs, setting off a renewed hot spring fever.

In recent years, hot spring spas and resorts on Taiwan have gained more popularity. With the support of the government, the hot spring has become not only another industry but also again part of Taiwanese culture.

Taiwan has one of the highest concentrations (more than 100 hot springs) and greatest variety of thermal springs in the world varying from hot springs to cold springs, mud springs, and seabed hot springs.

Geology
Taiwan is located on a faultline where several continental plates meet; the Philippine Sea Plate and the Eurasian Plate intersect in the Circum-Pacific seismic zone.

Types of springs
 Sodium carbonate springs
 Sulfur springs
 Ferrous springs
 Sodium hydrogen carbonate springs
 Mud springs 
(spring water contains alkaline and iodine, is salty and has a light sulfuric smell)
 Salt or hydrogen sulfide springs

Partial list of hot springs in Taiwan

 Jiaoxi
 Dakeng
 Beitou - is considered the "hot spring capital of Taiwan".
 Zhiben
 Tai-an - is an odorless and colorless alkaline carbonate hot spring.
 Yangmingshan 
 Guguan
 Guanziling - is known for its mud baths.
 Sichongxi
 Wulai
 Ruisui, Hualien - this hot spring has a high iron content, consequently the water has a brownish tint.
 Zhaori

See also
 Onsen
 Culture of Taiwan
 List of hot springs

References

External links

 Taiwanzen, website about Taiwan and hot springs 
 Taiwanese Hot Springs Taiwan Journal
 Hot spring tour, Tourism Bureau, R.O.C.

 
Tourism in Taiwan
Geothermal areas
Taiwanese culture
Balneotherapy
Geology of Taiwan
History of Taiwan
Hydrology
Spa towns
Thermal treatment